The Perkins Brailler is a "braille typewriter" with a key corresponding to each of the six dots of the braille code, a space key, a backspace key, and a line space key.  Like a manual typewriter, it has two side knobs to advance paper through the machine and a carriage return lever above the keys.  The rollers that hold and advance the paper have grooves designed to avoid crushing the raised dots the brailler creates.

Although braille notation was designed for people who are blind or visually impaired to read, prior to the introduction of the Perkins Brailler, writing braille was a cumbersome process. Braille writers created braille characters with a stylus and slate (as developed by Louis Braille) or by using one of the complex, expensive, and fragile braille writing machines available at the time.

History

The first Braille writer machine was presented by Frank Haven Hall in 1892.

The original Perkins Brailler was produced in 1951 by David Abraham (1896–1978), a woodworking teacher at the Perkins School for the Blind that was dissatisfied with problems of the existing technology.  The director of the Perkins School for the Blind, Gabriel Farrell, asked Abraham to create an inexpensive and reliable machine to allow students to more easily write braille.  Farrell and Abraham worked with Edward Waterhouse, who was a math teacher at Perkins, to create the design for the Brailler.

In 2008, a lighter and quieter version was developed and launched. It also includes an erase key and an integrated carrying handle. The new model won the Silver Award in the 2009 International Design Excellence Awards.

The paper placement is achieved by rolling the paper onto an internal drum, unrolling it when the user presses a line-feed key, and using a clock-like escapement to move an embossing carriage over the paper.  A system of six cams consisting of rods with a square cross-section transfers keystrokes to the wire-like styli contained in the carriage.  Tolerances are close, and the buildup of oily dirt with normal use necessitates periodic cleaning and adjustment.

SMART Brailler

A new version of the Perkins Brailler, the SMART Brailler, was invented by David S. Morgan and released in 2011.  The SMART Brailler is based on the mechanical action of the classic Perkins Brailler, and, when unpowered, is operable as a standard Brailler.  The SMART Brailler includes sensors capturing the mechanical motion of the embosser, and, when powered, adds text-to-speech audio feedback and a digital display for use by both sighted and blind individuals. Software for the SMART Brailler includes multi-lingual speech and Braille support, including English, UK English, Arabic, French, German, Italian, Portuguese, Polish, Russian, and Turkish.

Embossers
With the advent of computers, many users create braille output using a computer and a braille embosser connected to the computer.  Visually impaired users can read the computer screen by using screen reader computer software and/or braille displays.  Users of such a system can use a computer keyboard in the standard way for typing or can use a special keyboard driver that allows the six keys sdf-jkl to be used as a braille entry device similar to the Perkins Brailler.

Braille notetakers
Many visually impaired users use electronic portable note-taking devices that allow keyboard entry in braille using the 6-key layout of the Perkins Brailler and output in synthesized speech and/or a one or two-line refreshable braille display consisting of tiny pins made of metal and plastic.

Notetakers include PDA features such as an address book and calculator.  Because of the many moving parts and the accessibility of the refreshable braille displays to the environment, notetakers are typically quite expensive.  They are easily damaged and must be returned to their country of origin for periodic cleaning.

See also
 Mountbatten Brailler
 Book
 E-book
 Braille e-book
 Braille translator
 Braille embosser

References

External links
 Perkins Brailler Website
 Perkins School for the Blind
 "About Perkins Braillers" at Perkins School for the Blind
 Braille Writer Simulator online
 Braille-n-Print converter
 Perkin SMART Brailler website

Assistive technology
Braille technology
Articles containing video clips